The 1897 Clemson Tigers football team represented Clemson Agricultural College—now known as Clemson University–during the 1897 Southern Intercollegiate Athletic Association football season.  The Tigers completed their season as a member of the Southern Intercollegiate Athletic Association with a record of 2–2, with wins over South Carolina and a Charlotte YMCA team, and losses to Georgia and North Carolina. All games were played in the opposing school's home city.  William M. Williams served as the team's coach for his first season while W. T. Brock was the captain. The team was state champion.

Schedule

References

Clemson
Clemson Tigers football seasons
Clemson Tigers football